2008 Desafio Internacional das Estrelas was the fourth edition of Desafio Internacional das Estrelas (International Challenge of the Stars) held on 2 December 2008. The event consisted of warmup, qualifying and race sessions with the overall winner determined by the aggregate points score from the two races. The ten fastest qualifiers took part in the top ten shootout for the pole which was won by Lucas di Grassi. The qualifying rounds set the grid for the first race which was won by Rubens Barrichello. The starting grid of the second race was determined by the results of the first race although the top eight of the first race were reversed. The second race also provided less points than the first. It was won by Felipe Massa. Overall winner of the event was Rubens Barrichello as he scored the most points ahead of Lucas di Grassi and Felipe Massa.

Qualifying

Race 1

 Race 1 winner Rubens Barrichello's average speed was 83.70 km/h.
 Race 1 fastest lap was by Michael Schumacher 41.537s

Race 2

Race 2 winner Felipe Massa's average speed was 84.97 km/h.
Race 2 fastest lap was by Rubens Barrichello 41.650s

Final classification

2008
Desafio